Juan Carlos Rojas may refer to:

Juan Carlos Rojas (footballer), a professional footballer
Juan Carlos Rojas Villegas, a professional cyclist